Monoharpur is a village in Chanditala II CD Block in Srirampore subdivision of Hooghly district in the state of West Bengal, India. It was earlier recorded as a census town.

Geography

Demographics
 India census, Manoharpur had a population of 20,825. Males constitute 53% of the population and females 47%. Manoharpur has an average literacy rate of 72%, higher than the national average of 59.5%: male literacy is 75%, and female literacy is 69%. In Manoharpur, 11% of the population is under 6 years of age.

References

Villages in Chanditala II CD Block